Carl Gray "The Grey Fox" Snavely (July 30, 1894 – July 12, 1975) was an American football and baseball coach.  He served as the head football coach at Bucknell University (1927–1933), the University of North Carolina at Chapel Hill (1934–1935, 1945–1952), Cornell University (1936–1944), and Washington University in St. Louis (1953–1958), compiling a career college football record of 180–96–16.  Snavely was inducted into the College Football Hall of Fame as a coach in 1965.

Snavley was the head football coach at Bellefonte Academy in Bellefonte, Pennsylvania from 1922 to 1926, tallying a mark of 40–2–3 in five seasons.  From 1927 to 1933, Snavely served as the head football coach at Bucknell, where he compiled a 42–16–8 record. From 1934 to 1935, and from 1945 to 1952, he served as the head football coach at North Carolina, where he compiled a 59–35–5 record. He was a proponent of the single wing offense. From 1936 to 1944, he served as the head football coach at Cornell, where he compiled a 46–26–3 record. He was a 1915 graduate of Lebanon Valley College in Annville, Pennsylvania, where he played four years on the football team.  He was a 1976 inductee into their athletic Hall of Fame.

Head coaching record

College football

References

External links
 
 
 

1894 births
1975 deaths
Baseball first basemen
Basketball coaches from Nebraska
Bucknell Bison baseball coaches
Bucknell Bison football coaches
Cornell Big Red football coaches
Chambersburg Maroons players
Lancaster Red Roses players
Lebanon Valley Flying Dutchmen baseball players
Lebanon Valley Flying Dutchmen football players
Marietta Pioneers baseball coaches
Marietta Pioneers football coaches
Marietta Pioneers men's basketball coaches
North Carolina Tar Heels football coaches
Washington University Bears football coaches
York White Roses players
High school football coaches in Pennsylvania
College Football Hall of Fame inductees
Sportspeople from Omaha, Nebraska
Players of American football from Nebraska